Bela oceanica is a species of sea snail, a marine gastropod mollusk in the family Mangeliidae.

Taxonomy
Species of uncertain validity, in need of revision.

Description
The length of the shell varies between 7 mm and 9 mm.

Distribution
This species is found in European waters, in the English Channel; in the Alboran Sea, Mediterranean Sea; in the Atlantic Ocean off West Africa and the Canary Islands.

References

 Locard, Arnould. Mollusques testacés: Expéditions scientifiques du Travailleur et du Talisman pendant les années 1880, 1881, 1882, 1883/sous la dir. de A. Milne-Edward. Masson, 1897.
 Gofas, S.; Le Renard, J.; Bouchet, P. (2001). Mollusca, in: Costello, M.J. et al. (Ed.) (2001). European register of marine species: a check-list of the marine species in Europe and a bibliography of guides to their identification. Collection Patrimoines Naturels, 50: pp. 180–213

External links
 Biolib.cz: Image of Bela oceanica
  Tucker, J.K. 2004 Catalog of recent and fossil turrids (Mollusca: Gastropoda). Zootaxa 682:1-1295.

oceanica